Maa Nanna Chiranjeevi is a 2010 Indian Telugu-language drama film produced by Murali Krishna on Laughing Lords Entertainments banner and directed by P. A. Arun Prasad. Starring Jagapati Babu, Neelima, Master Atulith  and music composed by Hemachandra. The film is a remake of 2006 American film The Pursuit of Happyness, starring Will Smith and his son Jaden Smith.

Plot
The film begins at Razole where Kommalapati Chiranjeevi is a lowbrow laird. Sandhya is a lavish city-bred who is forcibly knitted with him considering his silver spoon. Sandhya starts an unwilling derision life with Chiranjeevi and the two are blessed with a son Viswanath. Slowly, she throws him into bankruptcy for her greed. Chiranjeevi takes up the crisis simply as he thinks his family is ample to him. After a few years, Vishwanath a naughty plucky boy conducts several mischievous deeds and Chiranjeevi covers up it. Since father-son share an enormous deep bond. As of today, Sandhya acquires a fine job, dumbs her husband, and willy-nilly tries to grab the kid. Like a shot, Chiranjeevi retorts, challenges Sandhya to rear their son better than her, and also states that one day she will discern the values of relations. 

Presently, Chiranjeevi lands in the city underdetermination to admit Viswanath to the finest school. At the outset itself, he is swindled by a scammer who sticks a lot of dictionaries to him in name of the business that does not work. He struggles hard and faces many mortifications for the survival of his son. Just like being thrown away from railway platforms because of nonpassengers, kicked out from a wedding ceremony taking into account uninvited guests and sleeping inside an empty movie theatre, etc. Anyhow, Chiranjeevi thresholds the pain with patience. To keep Viswanath happy he fictions himself as an undercover CBI officer because he should not know the actuality. Now Chiranjeevi succeeds in acquiring a seat in a renowned school but its fee is very pricey. The school administration gives him 1 month time to pay it and takes Viswanath. 

Hence, Chiranjeevi scrimps & scrounges doing countless works for 20 hours a day including donating his blood for the money. In that process, once, he rescues a factory when with an officer's aid he applies for a fireman post and prepares for it. On the final day, Chiranjeevi triumphs in accumulating the amount but alas, some goons steal it which crushes him. Simultaneously, Viswanath meets with an accident and is operated on soon for which Chiranjeevi needs money. So, he flares up on the thugs who robbed him, retrieves his money, and safeguards his son. Therefrom, everything goes while Chiranjeevi pays the fee, intellectually sells all the dictionaries and gains the fireman job. At last, Sandhya also backs after soul-searching. Finally, the movie ends on a happy note with the reunion of the family.

Cast

 Jagapati Babu as Kommalapati Chiranjeevulu
 Neelima as Kommalapati Sandhya
 Master Atulith as Kommalapati Vishwanath
 Brahmanandam as Maniratnam
 Ali as Ram Gopal Varma
 M. S. Narayana as School Principal Rajanala
 Jaya Prakash Reddy as Rohit
 Banerjee
 Rajababu as Sandhya's father
 Satyam Rajesh as Nagesh
 Venu
 Tirupathi Prakash
 Jogi Naidu
 Fish Venkat
 Gautam Raju
 Gundu Sudarshan
 Junior Relangi
 Jenny
 Telangana Shakuntala as Didi
 Jhansi as PRO Fathima Sastry
 Bangalore Padma as Sandhya's mother
 Apoorva
 Kalpana
 Ragini
 Poornima

Soundtrack

Music composed by Hemachandra. Music released on ADITYA Music Company.

References

External links

2010 films
2010s Telugu-language films
Indian remakes of American films
Films directed by P. A. Arun Prasad